Howard County is located in the U.S. state of Maryland. As of the 2020 census, the population was 334,529. Since there are no incorporated municipalities, there is no incorporated county seat either. Therefore, its county seat is the unincorporated community of Ellicott City. Howard County is included in the Baltimore-Columbia-Towson, MD Metropolitan Statistical Area, which is also part of the larger Washington-Baltimore-Arlington, DC-MD-VA-WV-PA Combined Statistical Area.

Recent south county development has led to some realignment towards the Washington, D.C. media and employment markets. The county is home to Columbia, a major planned community of approximately 100,000 founded in 1967.

Howard County is frequently cited for its affluence, quality of life, and excellent schools. Its estimated 2020 median household income of $124,042 makes it one of the wealthiest counties in the US. Many of the most affluent communities in the area, such as Clarksville, Dayton, Glenelg, Glenwood,  and West Friendship, are located along the Route 32 corridor in Howard County. The main population center of Columbia/Ellicott City is regularly ranked in Money magazine's Top 10 "Best Places to Live".  According to data from the U.S. Census Bureau, Howard County ranks fourth in the nation for educational attainment, with an estimated 63.6% of residents 25 and over holding a bachelor's degree or higher. In 2022, the Howard County Public School System, was ranked the best school district in Maryland and the Baltimore Area.

In 2010, the center of population of Maryland was located in the Howard County town of Jessup.

Etymology

The name of the county honors Colonel John Eager Howard, an officer in the "Maryland Line" of the Continental Army in the American Revolutionary War, commander notably at the Battle of Cowpens in South Carolina in 1781, among others. He was the fifth governor of Maryland, serving from 1788 to 1791.

History

The lands of prehistoric Howard County were populated by Native Americans. The Maryland Historical Trust has documented sites along the Patapsco, Patuxent, Middle and Little Patuxent River valleys. In 1652, the Susquehannock tribes signed a peace treaty with Maryland, giving up their provenance over the territory that is now Howard County. In 1800, the mean center of U.S. population as calculated by the US Census Bureau was found in what is now Howard County.

In 1838, Dr. William Watkins of Richland Manor proposed the "Howard District" of Anne Arundel County. After several adjournments, the area of western Anne Arundel County was designated the Howard District in 1839. The district had the same status as a county except that it was not separately represented in the Maryland General Assembly. In 1841, the county built its first courthouse in Ellicott City. At the January 1851 constitutional convention, Thomas Beale Dorsey submitted a petition led by James Sykes. A committee was formed with Dorsey, Bowie, Smith, Harbine and Ricaud. After several postponements, the district was erected officially as Howard County on March 7, 1851.

The plantations of modern Howard County used slave labor as early as 1690. At the time of the Underground Railroad, some Howard County residents assisted slaves who were escaping to freedom. This was particularly risky, as many prominent plantation families were Confederate sympathizers during the Civil War, contributing militiamen to the South to protect local interests. Maryland was exempt from the Emancipation Proclamation, later abolishing slavery in the update of the Maryland Constitution in November 1864.

On May 1, 1883, Howard County joined Anne Arundel County and Harford County in liquor prohibition.

Most traffic consisted of loads delivered to rail crossings. In 1909, County Commissioners Hess, Werner and O'Neil were charged with malfeasance regarding contract bids.

In 1918, a deadly flu pandemic swept the county starting with an early outbreak in Camp Meade in adjacent Anne Arundel County. The 1930s saw a shift from one-room schoolhouses to centralized schools with bus service. By 1939 wheat harvesting fell to just . In 1940, local newspaper owner Paul Griffith Stromberg led a five-county commission to study a superhighway between Baltimore and Washington through Howard County. The Federal Aid Highway Act of 1956 eventually led to the construction of Interstate 70 across northern Howard County and Interstate 95 across the eastern part of the county. The sparsely populated county hosted population centers in Ellicott City, Elkridge, Savage, North Laurel and Lisbon with W.R. Grace and Johns Hopkins Applied Physics Lab as the largest new employers. Residents elected officials that campaigned to keep the county rural while planners prepared public works to support a quarter million residents by the year 2000. Race relations and desegregation became major issues of the time.

From 1963 to 1966 the Rouse Company bought  of land and rezoned it for the Columbia Development. In 1972, the Marriott company proposed to build a regional theme park on Rouse-owned land but was denied zoning.

The county has a number of properties on the National Register of Historic Places.

Geography
It is the second-smallest county in Maryland by land area and smallest by total area.

Howard County is located in the Piedmont Plateau region of Maryland, with rolling hills making up most of the landscape. It is bounded on the north and northeast by the Patapsco River, on the southwest by the Patuxent River, and on the southeast by a land border with Anne Arundel County. Both the Patapsco and Patuxent run largely through publicly accessible parkland along the county borders. The Patuxent border includes the Triadelphia and Rocky Gorge reservoirs.

Adjacent counties
 Anne Arundel County (southeast)
 Baltimore County (northeast)
 Carroll County (north)
 Montgomery County (southwest)
 Prince George's County (south)

Climate
Howard County lies in the humid subtropical climate zone. As one travels west in the county away from the Baltimore area, the winter temperatures get lower and winter snow is more common. Annual rainfall is about  throughout the county. Over a 60-year period from 1950 to 2010, there were 394 National Climatic Data Center reportable events causing 617 injuries, and 99 fatalities. There were 9 reported tornadoes, reaching a maximum of F2, with no recorded fatalities.

Demographics
For much of the 1800s and 1900s, Howard County was a predominantly white and mainly rural county with a small population and little ethnic, racial, or religious diversity. Howard County's legacy of racism includes slavery, lynchings, and segregation. In 1950, the population was only 23,000. Since the 1950s, the county's population has increased tenfold and has diversified into a majority minority county. Almost half of Howard County's population identified as non-Hispanic and/or non-white by 2017. Much of the racial diversification of Howard County came after 1967, when The Rouse Company designed Columbia to be a planned community that included people from diverse socioeconomic and racial backgrounds. African-Americans have lived in Howard County for centuries, with the African-American population increasing greatly after the 1960s. Immigration from Asia, particularly Korea, India, and China, as well as Latin America, has also contributed to Howard County's diversity. While historically primarily Christian, Howard County now has sizable Jewish, Muslim, and Hindu populations.

2020 census

Note: the US Census treats Hispanic/Latino as an ethnic category. This table excludes Latinos from the racial categories and assigns them to a separate category. Hispanics/Latinos can be of any race.

As of the 2020 United States census, there were 328,200 people by June 1, 2020 The population density was

2010 census
As of the 2010 United States census, there were 287,085 people, 104,749 households, and 76,333 families residing in the county. The racial makeup of the county was 62.2% white, 17.5% Black or African American, 14.4% Asian, 0.3% American Indian, 2.0% from other races, and 3.6% from two or more races. Those of Hispanic or Latino origin made up 5.8% of the population. In terms of ancestry, 17.7% were German, 13.9% were Irish, 10.6% were English, 7.0% were Italian, and 4.6% were American.

Of the 104,749 households, 39.3% had children under the age of 18 living with them, 58.9% were married couples living together, 10.5% had a female householder with no husband present, 27.1% were non-families, and 21.9% of all households were made up of individuals. The average household size was 2.72, and the average family size was 3.20. The median age was 38.4 years.

The median income for a household in the county was $103,273, and the median income for a family was $119,810. Males had a median income of $82,307 versus $59,128 for females. The per capita income for the county was $45,294. About 2.8% of families and 4.2% of the population were below the poverty line, including 4.6% of those under age 18 and 5.5% of those age 65 or over.

2000 census
As of the census of 2000, there were 247,842 people, 90,043 households, and 65,821 families residing in the county. The racial makeup of the county was 74.33% White, 14.42% Black, 0.24% Native American, 7.68% Asian, 0.04% Pacific Islander, 1.11% from other races, and 2.19% from two or more races.  3.02% of the population were Hispanic or Latino of any race. 15.1% were of German, 11.0% Irish, 9.3% English, 6.6% Italian and 5.7% American ancestry.

There were 90,043 households, out of which 40.00% had children under the age of 18 living with them, 60.50% were married couples living together, 9.50% had a female householder with no husband present, and 26.90% were non-families. 20.80% of all households were made up of individuals, and 4.60% had someone living alone who was 65 years of age or older.  The average household size was 2.71, and the average family size was 3.18.

In the county, the population was spread out, with 28.10% under the age of 18, 6.30% from 18 to 24, 34.40% from 25 to 44, 23.80% from 45 to 64, and 7.50% who were 65 years of age or older.  The median age was 36 years. For every 100 females, there were 96.60 males.  For every 100 females age 18 and over, there were 92.90 males.

The median income for a household in the county was $101,003, and the median income for a family was $117,186 in 2009. The per capita income was $44,120.  About 2.70% of families and 4.00% of the population were below the poverty line.

Education
The Howard County Public School System, the school district for the entire county, manages 71 schools and serves approximately 49,000 students. The graduation rate from this school district was 90.4% in 2009, and the county's schools are ranked among the best in the state. Student test scores consistently top the list for all Maryland school districts. Howard High School is currently the largest school in the county with over 1,700 students.

Library
In 2013 Howard County Library System was selected as the Library of the Year by Library Journal and cited by editor-at-large, John N. Berry, as  "a 21st-century library model, with a position, doctrine, purpose, and curriculum worthy of study and consideration by every library in America, if not the world."  In 2015 the Howard County Library System was designated the top Star Library in its class.

Under the library's sponsorship, a campaign called "Choose Civility" started in Howard County in 2006. According to its website, "Choose Civility is an ongoing community-wide initiative, led by Howard County Library, to position Howard County as a model of civility. The project intends to enhance respect, empathy, consideration and tolerance in Howard County." The campaign's distinctive green bumper stickers are often seen in Howard County and neighboring areas.

Politics and government

Howard County has voted for the Democratic presidential candidate in every election from 1992 on, and has become increasingly Democratic in subsequent presidential elections. In the 2020 presidential election, Democratic Party candidate Joe Biden received the highest percentage of Howard County's votes of any presidential candidate in the history of the county. The less-populated western and northern parts of Howard County lean Republican. The more heavily populated southern and eastern parts are heavily Democratic.

Although the county votes more Democratic in federal elections, it has a record of acting as a bellwether in state-wide elections since the late 20th century: Since at least the 1950s, Howard County has voted for the successful senatorial candidate in both Maryland’s Class I and Class III seats, and since 1998 the county has voted for the successful gubernatorial candidate, voting for Republican Bob Ehrlich in the 2002 gubernatorial election, Democrat Martin O'Malley in 2006 and 2010, Republican Larry Hogan in 2014 and 2018, and Democrat Wes Moore in 2022.

At the state level of government, Howard County is represented by nine Democrats in the Maryland House of Delegates and three Democrats in the Maryland Senate.  One Democratic state senator from the county represents a district that spills into Montgomery County to the west, as do two Democratic state delegates.

From 1914 to 1968, Howard County was governed by a system of three elected commissioners with four-year terms. Prior to 1962, the only polling location in the county was located in Ellicott City. In May 1962, voters were offered a second location to vote, also in Ellicott City at the National Armory on Montgomery Road. Senator James Clark Jr. proposed a five-person County Council and a County Executive in 1965. In 1968, the county implemented a charter form of government. In 1984 a councilmanic referendum was approved, switching council from at-large representation to district representation. The County Council serves as the county's legislative branch; members also provide constituent service and sit as members of the Zoning Board and Liquor Board. The current Howard County Executive is Democrat Calvin Ball III, who was elected in November 2018 and took office on December 3, 2018. The county is entirely within Maryland's 3rd congressional district, represented by Democrat John Sarbanes.

|}

County Council
The County Council adopts ordinances and resolutions, and has all of the County's legislative powers. There are five council districts throughout the county. The current County Council as of December 2022 includes 4 Democrats and 1 Republican.

County commissioners

County executives and council members

Departments

Economy
Statistics for July 2014 indicate that Howard County's unemployment rate is at 5.2 percent (7,527 persons).

Howard County Public School System employs 8,136 of which 4,670 are teachers. The County Government employs 3,323 outside of the school system with 672 police, 482 public works, and 472 fire and rescue employees. The top ten private sector employers in Howard County are as follows:

Awards

Awards and recognitions achieved by Howard County or locations within it include the following:

 "4th Richest County in America", Forbes Magazine, 2017.
 "Best American Values", Newsmax Magazine: Ellicott City #17 (2009).
 "Best Place to Live", CNN/Money: Columbia (#1 in 2016); Ellicott City/Columbia (#6 in 2014; #8 in 2012; #2 in 2010; #8 in 2008; #4 in 2006.)
"Best Places to Live for Pet Lovers", CNN/Money: Ellicott City, one of 10 (2009).
"Best Place to Raise a Family", Forbes: #17 (2008).
 "Good Sports Community of the Year", Sports Illustrated (2005)
"Great Public Library System", Hennen's American Public Library Ratings: #4 in population category in 2010; 8 times appearing in top 10 in a 10-year range.
 "Healthiest Maryland County", University of Wisconsin Population Health Institute. (2013, 2012, 2011, 2010)
 "Heart Safe Community of the Year", International Association of Fire Chiefs. (2012)
 "Library of the Year", Library Journal. (2013)
 "Preserve America Community", Advisory Council on Historic Preservation. (2013)
 Top Outdoor Concert Venue for Merriweather Post Pavilion (a top five) by Pollstar (2012).
"Tree City Community", Arbor Day Foundation. (23 years)
"Venues that Rock", Rolling Stone: #4 outdoor venue, Merriweather Post Pavilion (2013).
"Winning Community", National Civic League. (2001)

Notable people
 Brent Faiyaz, singer and record producer.
 K.A.A.N., a rapper and songwriter.

Culture and attractions

 Blandair, an open space preserve
 Bollman Truss Railroad Bridge
 The Candlelight Concert Society
 The Chesapeake Shakespeare Company
 Clark's Elioak Farm
 Columbia Center for Theatrical Arts
 The Columbia Orchestra
 Ellicott City Historic Main Street
 Ellicott City Station
 The Enchanted Forest (closed – some features relocated to Clark's Elioak Farm)
 Howard County Center for the Arts
 Howard County Library
 Horowitz Visual and Performing Arts Center
 Larriland Pick-Your-Own Farm
 Merriweather Post Pavilion
 Rep Stage
 James and Anne Robinson Nature Center
 Savage Mill
 Shrine of St. Anthony
 Toby's Dinner Theatre

Transportation

Airports
Howard County does not have any public or commercial airport facilities. A 1967 Airport Study Commission recommended a facility for 150–250 aircraft to provide economic development, but was not initiated. With the closure of Haysfield Airport, there is one privately owned airstrip, Glenair Airport in Glenelg. Commercial air service is provided by Baltimore–Washington International Thurgood Marshall Airport, Ronald Reagan Washington National Airport, and Washington Dulles International Airport.

Public transportation
Bus routes that operate in Howard County are managed by the Regional Transportation Agency of Central Maryland and the Maryland Transit Administration.

Major Highways

Communities
Howard County has no incorporated municipalities.

Census-designated places
The Census Bureau recognizes the following Census-designated places in the county:

Columbia
Elkridge
Ellicott City (county seat)
Fulton
Highland
Ilchester
Jessup (partly in Anne Arundel County)
North Laurel
Savage
Scaggsville

Unincorporated communities
Unincorporated places not listed as Census-designated places but known in the area include:

Clarksville
Cooksville
Daniels
Dayton
Dorsey
Glenelg
Glenwood
Granite
Guilford
Hanover (partly in Anne Arundel County)
Isaacsville
Lisbon
Marriottsville (partly in Carroll County and Baltimore County)
Simpsonville
West Friendship
Woodbine
Woodstock

See also

National Register of Historic Places listings in Howard County, Maryland
Maryland Historical Trust Register of Historic Places in Howard County, Maryland

References

External links

Howard County historian Celia M. Holland papers at the University of Maryland Libraries

 
1838 establishments in Maryland
Populated places established in 1838
Baltimore metropolitan area
Maryland counties
Populated places on the Underground Railroad
Majority-minority counties and independent cities in Maryland